The 1967–68 NBA season was the Lakers' 20th season in the NBA and eighth season in Los Angeles. This was the first season the Lakers uniforms featured what would become the signature gold and purple colors. This was also the first season the team played at The Forum in Inglewood, where the Lakers would achieve fame in the immediate future, and played 31 seasons at this venue.

Roster

Regular season

Season standings

Record vs. opponents

Game log

Playoffs

|- align="center" bgcolor="#ccffcc"
| 1
| March 24
| Chicago
| W 109–101
| Jerry West (33)
| Elgin Baylor (23)
| Elgin Baylor (8)
| The Forum7,352
| 1–0
|- align="center" bgcolor="#ccffcc"
| 2
| March 25
| Chicago
| W 111–106
| Jerry West (35)
| Elgin Baylor (16)
| Jerry West (8)
| The Forum8,158
| 2–0
|- align="center" bgcolor="#ffcccc"
| 3
| March 27
| @ Chicago
| L 98–104
| Jerry West (32)
| Darrall Imhoff (15)
| Elgin Baylor (5)
| Chicago Stadium3,456
| 2–1
|- align="center" bgcolor="#ccffcc"
| 4
| March 29
| @ Chicago
| W 93–87
| Elgin Baylor (27)
| Darrall Imhoff (21)
| Elgin Baylor (5)
| Chicago Stadium5,678
| 3–1
|- align="center" bgcolor="#ccffcc"
| 5
| March 31
| Chicago
| W 122–99
| Elgin Baylor (37)
| Elgin Baylor (12)
| Archie Clark (10)
| The Forum12,108
| 4–1
|-

|- align="center" bgcolor="#ccffcc"
| 1
| April 5
| San Francisco
| W 133–105
| Elgin Baylor (29)
| Elgin Baylor (16)
| Archie Clark (5)
| The Forum10,319
| 1–0
|- align="center" bgcolor="#ccffcc"
| 2
| April 10
| San Francisco
| W 115–112
| Baylor, West (36)
| Elgin Baylor (19)
| Jerry West (5)
| The Forum11,270
| 2–0
|- align="center" bgcolor="#ccffcc"
| 3
| April 11
| @ San Francisco
| W 128–124
| Jerry West (40)
| Elgin Baylor (12)
| Jerry West (8)
| Cow Palace9,232
| 3–0
|- align="center" bgcolor="#ccffcc"
| 4
| April 13
| @ San Francisco
| W 106–100
| Jerry West (29)
| Elgin Baylor (20)
| Archie Clark (5)
| Cow Palace9,623
| 4–0
|-

|- align="center" bgcolor="#ffcccc"
| 1
| April 21
| @ Boston
| L 101–107
| Jerry West (25)
| Darrall Imhoff (14)
| Archie Clark (5)
| Boston Garden9,546
| 0–1
|- align="center" bgcolor="#ccffcc"
| 2
| April 24
| @ Boston
| W 123–113
| Jerry West (35)
| Darrall Imhoff (11)
| Erwin Mueller (7)
| Boston Garden14,780
| 1–1
|- align="center" bgcolor="#ffcccc"
| 3
| April 26
| Boston
| L 119–127
| Jerry West (33)
| Elgin Baylor (18)
| Jerry West (9)
| The Forum17,011
| 1–2
|- align="center" bgcolor="#ccffcc"
| 4
| April 28
| Boston
| W 118–105
| Jerry West (38)
| Darrall Imhoff (20)
| Darrall Imhoff (6)
| The Forum17,147
| 2–2
|- align="center" bgcolor="#ffcccc"
| 5
| April 30
| @ Boston
| L 117–120 (OT)
| Jerry West (35)
| Elgin Baylor (15)
| Baylor, West (6)
| Boston Garden14,780
| 2–3
|- align="center" bgcolor="#ffcccc"
| 6
| May 2
| Boston
| L 109–124
| Elgin Baylor (28)
| Mel Counts (25)
| Elgin Baylor (6)
| The Forum17,392
| 2–4
|-

Awards and records
 Elgin Baylor, All-NBA First Team
 Jerry West, All-NBA Second Team
 Elgin Baylor, NBA All-Star Game
 Jerry West, NBA All-Star Game
 Archie Clark, NBA All-Star Game

References

Los Angeles Lakers seasons
Los Angeles
Los Angle
Los Angle